Nell is a 1994 American drama film directed by Michael Apted from a screenplay written by William Nicholson. The film stars Jodie Foster (who also produced) as Nell Kellty, a young woman who has to face other people for the first time after being raised by her mother in an isolated cabin. Liam Neeson, Natasha Richardson, Richard Libertini, and Nick Searcy are featured in supporting roles. Based on Mark Handley's play Idioglossia, the script for Nell was developed by co-producer Renée Missel and was inspired by Handley's time living in the Cascade Mountains in the 1970s, and the story of Poto and Cabengo, twins who created their own language. Partway through the movie, the other characters discover that Nell is actually speaking English, just mispronouncing all the words. As an example, when Nell says "Nay Cay Chickabay," she is actually saying "Don't Cry Chickadee."

Nell received limited release on December 16, 1994, before expanding into wide release on December 23. The film upon release received mixed reviews from critics who praised the  direction, score and performances but criticised its execution and limited exploration of the titular character, and was a box office success grossing over $106 million worldwide, on a $24.5 million production budget.

Foster's performance was widely praised and brought her various awards and nominations. She won the inaugural Screen Actors Guild Award for Outstanding Performance by a Female Actor in a Leading Role and was nominated for the Academy Award for Best Actress and the Golden Globe Award for Best Actress – Motion Picture Drama. The film also received two additional nominations at the 52nd Golden Globe Awards for Best Motion Picture - Drama, and Best Original Score.

Plot
When Violet Kellty, who had an undiagnosed stroke, dies in her isolated cabin in the North Carolina mountains, Dr. Jerome "Jerry" Lovell, the town doctor, finds a terrified young woman hiding in the house rafters.  She speaks angrily and rapidly, but seems to have a language of her own.  Looking at Violet's bible, Jerry finds a note asking whoever finds it to look after Violet's daughter Nell.  Sheriff Todd Peterson shows Jerry a news clipping that Nell was conceived through rape.

Jerry seeks the help of Dr. Paula Olsen, a researcher working with autistic children.  Paula and her colleague Dr. Alexander "Al" Paley are interested in studying a "wild child" (feral child), and Al continues calling Nell this even after studying films showing that Nell does not fit the "wild child" profile.  Paula and Al get a court order to institutionalize Nell for further study.  Jerry  hires lawyer Don Fontana and prevents it.  The judge gives Jerry and Paula three months to interact with Nell and discover her needs.  Paula shows up on a houseboat with electronic equipment to monitor Nell's behavior while Jerry chooses to stay in a tent by Nell's cabin and quietly observe.

Paula discovers that Nell's seemingly indecipherable language is English, based partly on her mother's aphasic speech after a stroke, and partly on the secret language she shared with her decades-deceased identical twin sister. Jerry and Paula begin a grudging friendship.

Nell sleeps during the day or works inside her home and is active outdoors only after sunset.  She explains to Jerry that her mother told her about the rape and warned her that men were evildoers.  As Nell comes to trust Jerry, she sees him as a friend, the "gah'inja" her mother promised would come.  Jerry later realizes that "gah'inja" is Nell's phrase for "guardian angel."  To neutralize her fear of evildoers and getting raped, Paula has Jerry swim in the lake with Nell and she feels his body, hugs him, and has fun with him. Using popcorn as an incentive, Jerry is able to lead Nell outside and into the sun.  Nell leads Jerry and Paula to the decayed remains of her identical twin sister, May, who died in a fall while the two were playing in the woods.

Mike Ibarra, a reporter, learns of Nell's existence and visits her cabin.  Nell is curious of the visitor at first, but when he snaps a photo, the flash frightens Nell.  Jerry arrives and throws the reporter out. He realizes the reporter is not with the press and apologizes for overreacting, but asks him to forget he ever met her. Paula believes that Nell would be safer in a hospital, while Jerry feels that Nell should be left alone and allowed to live as she pleases. An argument ensues between the two with Paula accusing Jerry of using Nell for his own pleasure, but Nell manages to calm them down after hearing their conversation. The two decide that Nell should be shown a little of the world, and they make the decision to bring Nell into town.

While in town, Nell befriends Mary, Todd's depressed wife, goes shopping with Jerry and Paula, but also encounters some raunchy boys in a pool hall until Jerry gets her out due to her showing her body in front of everyone at their request. Jerry and Paula give Nell a book about love, romance, and intimacy to help her learn about making love, which she shows to understand by having Jerry and Paula touch each other’s faces and strengthening their bond. With increased intrusion by the press, Jerry and Paula take Nell to a hospital for her protection.  There, Nell becomes extremely despondent and unresponsive after seeing a vision of May.  Jerry removes her from the hospital and hides her in a hotel.  Paula joins him, and the two admit that they love each other.

At the court hearing the next day, Al, who wants to study Nell in a controlled environment, delivers his opinion that Nell has Asperger syndrome and belongs in an institution.  Nell then comes forward and, with Jerry interpreting, speaks for herself and ensures that there is no need to worry and fear for her, as she has no greater sorrows than everyone else. Five years later, Jerry and Paula bring their daughter, Ruthie, to visit Nell in her house on her birthday, and friends surround her. Nell treats Ruthie like a little sister and takes her to the lake, although this reminds her of May.

Cast

Production
Production took place in North Carolina, including the town of Robbinsville and the city of Charlotte.

Reception

Box office
The film debuted with $5.7 million. It eventually grossed $33.6 million domestically while bringing over $73 million around the world to a total of $106.6 million worldwide.

Critical response

Nell received mixed reviews from critics, who praised the cast but criticised the screenplay. Foster received widespread praise for her performance. The Washington Posts review noted that "Jodie Foster, transcendent in the bravura title role, is far grander than the film itself, and her performance helps camouflage the weaknesses of its structure and the naivete of its themes."  In her review for The New York Times, Janet Maslin noted that: "For all its technical brilliance, not even Ms. Foster's intense, accomplished performance in the title role holds much surprise. The wild-child story of 'Nell' unfolds in unexpectedly predictable ways, clinging fiercely to the banal thought that Nell's innocence makes her purer than anyone else in the story." Maslin also wished the film had explored Nell's adult sexuality. Roger Ebert liked the movie, commenting that "Despite its predictable philosophy, however, Nell is an effective film, and a moving one."  He also singled out the performances of Foster and Neeson. 
The film holds a score of 57% on Rotten Tomatoes from 35 reviews as of 2022, and with an average rating of 5.20/10. The site's consensus states: "Despite a committed performance by Jodie Foster, Nell opts for ponderous melodrama instead of engaging with the ethical dilemmas of socializing its titular wild child." On Metacritic it has a score of 60% based on reviews from 23 critics.

Year-end lists
 2nd – John Hurley, Staten Island Advance
 5th – Christopher Sheid, The Munster Times
 Top 10 (listed alphabetically, not ranked) – Eleanor Ringel, The Atlanta Journal-Constitution
 Top 10 (listed alphabetically, not ranked) – Jeff Simon, The Buffalo News
 Honorable mention – Betsy Pickle, Knoxville News-Sentinel
 Honorable mention – Duane Dudek, Milwaukee Sentinel
 Honorable mention – Michael MacCambridge, Austin American-Statesman

Accolades

References

External links
 

1994 films
1994 drama films
20th Century Fox films
American drama films
American films based on plays
1990s English-language films
Fictional-language films
Films about autism
Films about language
Films directed by Michael Apted
Films scored by Mark Isham
Films set in forests
Films set in North Carolina
Films shot in North Carolina
Films with screenplays by William Nicholson
PolyGram Filmed Entertainment films
1990s American films
Films about disability